Andreas Audretsch (born 25 June 1984) is a German politician of the Alliance 90/The Greens who has been serving as a member of the Bundestag since the 2021 German federal election.

Early life and education
Audretsch studied Politics, Journalism and Sociology. He also earned a PhD at the University of Potsdam.

Political career
In parliament, Audretsch has been a member of the Committee on Social Affairs since 2021. Since 2022, he has been serving as one his parliamentary group's deputy chairs, under the leadership of co-chairs Britta Haßelmann and Katharina Dröge, where he oversees the group's activities on financial policy, economic and social affairs.

Other activities
 German United Services Trade Union (ver.di), Member

References 

Living people
1984 births
Politicians from Stuttgart
Members of the Bundestag for Alliance 90/The Greens
Members of the Bundestag 2021–2025
University of Potsdam alumni
20th-century German people
21st-century German people
LGBT members of the Bundestag
German LGBT politicians
Gay politicians